Gyrostigma is a genus of botfly which parasitize rhinoceroses. The best-known species is Gyrostigma rhinocerontis, the rhinoceros stomach botfly, which develops in the stomach lining of the Black Rhinoceros and White Rhinoceros of Africa, and the adult of which is the largest fly known in Africa.

Two other species are known. G. conjungens was discovered in the stomach of a Kenyan Black Rhinoceros in 1901, but has not been observed since 1961. The other is G. sumatrensis, which was found in a captive Sumatran Rhinoceros in 1884 but has not been observed since. Due to the difficulty of observing these short-lived flies, it is possible that there are other species corresponding to the other species of rhinoceros, but they remain undescribed. It is also possible that several species of Gyrostigma are extinct because rhinoceros populations are tiny owing to their state of endangerment.

References 

 Barraclough, David A. "Bushels of Bots". In Natural History, June 2006.

Oestridae
Parasitic flies
Schizophora genera
Taxa named by Frederick William Hope